Randolph Spencer Churchill may refer to:
 Lord Randolph Churchill (1849–1895), British statesman and Winston Churchill's father
 Lady Randolph Churchill (1854–1921), American-born British socialite and wife of the above
 Randolph Churchill (1911–1968), major, MBE and Winston's son

Spencer family